The British Rail Class 04 is a 0-6-0 diesel-mechanical shunting locomotive class, built between 1952 and 1962 and was the basis for the later Class 03 built in the British Railways workshops.

History
The prototype locomotive was built in 1947 and served as a departmental shunter at Hither Green depot as number DS1173, before being transferred to the capital stock list as D2341 in 1967.

The Class 04 locomotives were supplied by the Drewry Car Co., which at the time (and for most of its existence) had no manufacturing capability. Drewry sub-contracted the construction work to two builders both of whom built other locomotives under the same arrangement. Early locomotives which became D2200-41 (including DS1173) were built by Vulcan Foundry in 1952–56, and later examples D2242-2339 were built by Robert Stephenson and Hawthorns in 1956–61.

Design evolution 
A clear line of development can be seen in the Class 04 from the 0-4-0DM locomotives built by Andrew Barclay and Drewry/Vulcan Foundry in the early 1940s. Similar 0-6-0DM locomotives had been built before the first Class 04, and others were built for industrial use.

The design continued to develop during the construction period, although this was generally confined to minor changes, including the diameter of the wheels.

The first batch (four engines numbered 11100-11103, later D2200-D2203) were equipped for street-running (see below).

The second batch (six engines numbered 11105-11110, later D2204-D2209) were fitted with conical exhaust stacks (the first batch initially had a plain exhaust "hole", later having a long, thin, and straight exhaust pipe added) and shaped cab front windows (instead of the rectangular windows of the first batch); these changes continued on all subsequent batches.

From the fourth batch (commencing with 11121, later D2215) the small cab side window of the earlier batches was replaced with a much larger window, the rear half of which slid open. The wheel diameter was also increased from 3 ft 3 in to 3 ft 6 in.

From locomotive D2274 onwards, the wheel diameter was again increased, from 3 ft 6 in to 3 ft 7 in. The front running plate was cut out and the steps inset to provide a safer location for a shunter riding on the locomotive; to facilitate this, the locomotive straight air brake reservoir tank was relocated underneath the centre of the running plate. This is the version depicted by the Airfix/Dapol plastic kit.

Use on tramways
The first four of these locomotives (11100-11103, later D2200-D2203) were fitted with side skirting and cowcatchers for use on the Wisbech and Upwell Tramway and on the Yarmouth Docks tramway system, since British law requires locomotives running on unfenced street trackage to be so equipped for the protection of pedestrians and animals. At least two later engines (11111/D2210 and 11113/D2212) were also fitted with cowcatchers and skirting for use on the Ipswich docks tramway system.

Usage
The class was distributed throughout the British Railways system, but the significant decline in the traffic for which they were designed resulted in a large surplus of shunting engines on the network. With this reduction in the need for shunters it was decided to standardise on the Class 03 as a light diesel-mechanical shunter and the Class 08 and 09 as larger, diesel-electric shunters, leading to the withdrawal of the class 04 engines.

Technical details

Overview
Mechanically they were identical to the Class 03, with the same 24 litre Gardner engine, 5-speed epicyclic gearbox and the same overall layout. They had a straight bonnet (US: hood) from the front to the rear-mounted cab, unlike the 03s which bulged higher towards the rear (over the larger fuel tank), and the cab's rounded roof met the sides at an angle instead of with a curve as in the 03, with a lip all the way round. The internal cab layout was almost symmetrical to allow the driver to work from either side as required.

Drive Train
The engine is a Gardner 8-cyl, 4-stroke 8L3 developing  at 1200 rpm, connected to a Wilson-Drewry CA5 R7, 5-speed epicyclic with RF11 spiral bevel reverse and final drive unit mounted on a jackshaft. The drive to the wheels was by coupling rods from the jackshaft.

Numbers

The prototype (of 1947) was numbered DS1173 in departmental service. The first 60 production units (from 1952) were numbered in the sequences 11100–11103, 11105–11115, 11121–11135, 11149–11160, and 11212–11229.

From 1957, new production units received numbers in the D-prefix ("Pre-TOPS") numbering series. All existing units were renumbered in the same series, sequentially from D2200 to D2259, with the new production units continuing from D2260 to D2340. Finally, the prototype locomotive left departmental service and entered the service fleet, being re-numbered as D2341; thus the oldest example of the class was allocated the last number in the numbering sequence.

Withdrawal
The Class 04s were withdrawn from service earlier than the Class 03, being taken out of service between June 1967 and May 1972, with some sold for re-use by industry. Four were exported to Italy about 1972, with D2289 reported as still in service until 2012.

Preservation 
21 examples of the class were preserved. Of these, 20 were BR Class 04 locomotives, and 1 was of the same type, but operated privately by the CEGB. One preserved engine, D2267, was scrapped in 2003, leaving 20 in preservation, including 19 originally operated by British Rail.

Related engines

British industrial units
A number of almost identical industrial locomotives were supplied to various private companies in the United Kingdom. One example (works number 2252) supplied to Adams Newport in 1948 is preserved at the Mangapps Railway Museum where it has been modified to recreate a Wisbech and Upwell Tramway Class 04, using the number 11104, which was not used in the actual class 04 numbering sequence.

Export engines
The Class 04 design was the basis of some related narrow gauge industrial engines built for export overseas. An example of this was the Tasmanian Government Railways V class which ran on 3 ft 6 in gauge, necessitating an outside frame design, which was the main visible difference. Western Australia also had a similar engine used by the power authority at the time also on 3 ft 6 in gauge.

Models
Airfix produced a plastic (static) OO kit in the 1960s; this is still available in the Dapol range as kit number C60.

Bachmann produced an example in N and 00, 0 and 1 gauge. An HO gauge model was made to be used as the Thomas and Friends character Mavis.

In O gauge Vulcan produced a Kit and Bachmann produced ready to run models.

Footnotes

References

External links

 

04
C locomotives
Vulcan Foundry locomotives
Robert Stephenson and Hawthorns locomotives
Railway locomotives introduced in 1952
Standard gauge locomotives of Great Britain